Live at Koncepts is a live album by Henry Threadgill recorded at the Koncepts Cultural Gallery in Oakland, California.  The album features seven of Threadgill's compositions performed by Threadgill's Very Very Circus with Mark Taylor, Brandon Ross, Masujaa Edwin Rodriguez, Marcus Rojas, and Larry Bright.

Reception
The Allmusic review by Brian Olewnick awarded the album 3 stars, stating, "Live at Koncepts isn't at quite the level of the best of this band's studio efforts (Spirit of Nuff...Nuff may take the prize there), but is quite enjoyable on its own. Any Threadgill fan will want to hear it".

Track listing
All compositions by Henry Threadgill
 "Next" - 9:04  
 "Snakes Don't Do Suicide" - 7:39  
 "I Love You with an Asterisk" - 5:40  
 "Someplace" - 7:30  
 "Dangerously Slippy" - 6:51  
 "King Kong" - 6:09  
 "Breach of Protocol" - 8:50  
Recorded at Koncepts Cultural Gallery in Oakland, CA on May 4, 1991

Personnel
Henry Threadgill - alto saxophone, flute, bass flute
Mark Taylor -  french horn
Brandon Ross, Masujaa - electric guitar, acoustic guitar
Edwin Rodriguez, Marcus Rojas - tuba
Larry Bright - drums percussion

References

Henry Threadgill albums
1991 live albums